Demirović (meaning Son of "Demir") is a Bosnian surname. Notable people with the surname include:

Alex Demirović, German sociologist
Andrea Demirović (born 1985), Montenegrin singer
Elian Demirović (born 2000), Slovenian footballer
Enes Demirović (born 1972), retired Bosnian footballer
Ermedin Demirović (born 1998), Bosnian footballer
Hasan Demirović (1941–42), Mayor of Sarajevo
Josip Demirović Devj (1939–1999), Croatian painter and sculptor

Bosnian surnames
Croatian surnames
Montenegrin surnames
Patronymic surnames